Mt. Vernon Methodist Church is a historic Methodist church in Maces Spring, Virginia, United States. It was built about 1895 and is a one-story, rectangular frame structure with gable roof and simple wooden steeple. The church is most notable for its association with the Carter Family, a traditional American Country music group that recorded between 1927 and 1956. Behind the church is the cemetery containing the graves of Alvin Pleasant "A.P." Delaney Carter (1891–1960) and his wife Sara Dougherty Carter (1898–1979).

It was listed on the National Register of Historic Places in 1985.

References

19th-century Methodist church buildings in the United States
Buildings and structures in Scott County, Virginia
Cash–Carter family
Churches completed in 1895
Methodist churches in Virginia
National Register of Historic Places in Scott County, Virginia
Churches on the National Register of Historic Places in Virginia
1895 establishments in Virginia